The Levi Wetherbee Farm is a historic farm at 484 Middle Road in Boxborough, Massachusetts.  The  property includes a farmhouse which dates to the mid-18th century (with additions and enlargement in the 19th century), rough fieldstone walls delineating some of its property lines, a c. 1904 icehouse that was relocated from another nearby farm, and heavily rutted car tracks indicating the agricultural use of the property for more than 250 years.

The farm was added to the National Register of Historic Places in 2006.

See also
National Register of Historic Places listings in Middlesex County, Massachusetts

References

Farms on the National Register of Historic Places in Massachusetts
Buildings and structures in Middlesex County, Massachusetts
National Register of Historic Places in Middlesex County, Massachusetts